Mittweidaer Ballspielclub, or simply Mittweidaer BC, was a German association football club from the town of Mittweida, Saxony. The club is notable as the first side in the city and as a founding member of the DFB (Deutsche Fußball Bund or German Football Association) at Leipzig in 1900.

History
Mittweidaer Ballspielclub was founded on 5 May 1896 by 12 students of the Mittweida technical school in Mittweida. The club's first chairman was Udo Steinberg, one of the founding members. On 28 January 1900, Steinberg was sent to Leipzig as one of Mittweida's delegates at the founding meeting of the DFB in the restaurant Zum Mariengarten. Another well-known member of the MBC is the multiple German champion in the 110 meter hurdles Vincenz Duncker. The team played in the Mitteldeutscher Ballspiel-Verband as an anonymous local side through most of its history with few exceptions.

Mittweida BC was the breeding from of some of the very first Spanish football stars, such as Antonio Alonso and Adolfo Uribe from Vigo, Juan Arzuaga from Bilbao, and Virgilio Da Costa and Udo Steinberg from Barcelona.

BC took part in the 1909–10 playoffs and were put out 6–0 by VfB Leipzig in a semi-final contest. Their next league playoff appearance was in the 1915–16 season, when they were eliminated 7–0 by Eintracht Leipzig.

In the 1944–45 season, they were united with Germania Mittweida as the wartime side (Kriegspielgemeinschaft) KSG Mittweida. "BC" was lost after World War II, while Germania re-emerged as SG Mittweida and appeared in the first division Landesliga Sachsen in 1948–49 before slipping to lower level play.

References

 Grüne, Hardy (2001). Vereinslexikon. Kassel: AGON Sportverlag 

Football clubs in Germany
Defunct football clubs in Saxony
Association football clubs established in 1896
1896 establishments in Germany
Association football clubs disestablished in 1945
1945 disestablishments in Germany
BC